The Akinomiya Hot Springs also known as Aki no Miya Onsenkyo is a thermal spring system and hot springs village in the Akinomiya Geothermal Area located along the western base of Mount Kurikoma in Akita Prefecture, Japan, (formerly Dewa Province, and after the Meiji era, Ugo Province). There are more than 50 hot springs and fumaroles in the area.

According to legend, the hot springs are the oldest in the prefecture. They were established 1,200 years ago. The onsen at Akinomiya were officially recognized in the Edo period (1603-1868) by the Akita Clan.

Some of the well known springs within the system include Inazumi, Takanoyu, Yunodai, Yunomata, among others found along the Yakunai River. Takanoyu Onsen is one of the better known hot springs of the Akinomiya Hot Springs region; the water emerges from the source at 162°F / 72°C. The footbaths, Kawara-no-Yukko (Riverbed Onsen), are accessed by digging among the river stones with a shovel to form shallow soaking pools.

There have been geothermal energy developments such as power plants within the area. Approximately 70% of the residential households draw their hot water from the springs.

The springs were written about by the Japanese novelist, poet and philosopher Saneatsu Mushanokoji among others.

Location and transportation
The Akinomiya Onsen area is located on highway route 108. By car from Yokobori, Akita, it is a 30 minute drive south. Akinomiya is served by the Yokobori Station via the JR East Ōu Main Line serving Akita prefecture. High speed rail service from Tokyo serves the southern Akita area via the Yamagata Shinkansen Shinjo Station or the Tohoku Shinkansen Furukawa Station.

Climate

See also
List of hot springs in Japan
List of hot springs in the world

References

Hot springs of Akita Prefecture
Geothermal energy in Japan
Balneotherapy